Chahar Divar (also Romanized as Chāhār Dīvār and Chahār Dīvār) is a village in Dasht-e Hor Rural District, in the Central District of Salas-e Babajani County, Kermanshah Province, Iran. At the 2006 census, its population was 28, in 6 families.

References 

Populated places in Salas-e Babajani County